Geraldine Arce Vanegas (born 1 February 1988) is a Nicaraguan swimmer, who specialized in sprint freestyle events. Arce qualified for the women's 50 m freestyle, as a 16-year-old, at the 2004 Summer Olympics in Athens, by receiving a Universality place from FINA, in an entry time of 28.15. She challenged seven other swimmers in heat four, including 31-year-old Melanie Slowing of Guatemala. She edged out Sri Lanka's Menaka de Silva to take a sixth spot by two tenths of a second (0.20) in 28.73. Arce failed to advance into the semifinals, as she placed fifty-first overall out of 75 swimmers on the last day of preliminaries.

References

External links
Sports Profile – Terra Central America 

1988 births
Living people
Nicaraguan female swimmers
Olympic swimmers of Nicaragua
Swimmers at the 2004 Summer Olympics
Pan American Games competitors for Nicaragua
Swimmers at the 2003 Pan American Games
Nicaraguan female freestyle swimmers
Sportspeople from Managua